Cercospora zonata is a fungal plant pathogen.

References

External links

zonata
Fungal plant pathogens and diseases